The 2019 Aichi gubernatorial election was held on 3 February 2019 to elect the Governor of Aichi. Incumbent Governor Hideaki Omura was re-elected for a third term, defeating Saichi Kurematsu with 83.32% of the vote.

Candidates 
Hideaki Omura, incumbent, endorsed by LDP, Komeito, CDP.
Saichi Kurematsu, JCP.

Results

References

External links

Official websites 

2019 elections in Japan
Gubernatorial elections in Japan
Politics of Aichi Prefecture